The Clue of the Broken Blade is Volume 21 in the original The Hardy Boys Mystery Stories published by Grosset & Dunlap.

This book was written for the Stratemeyer Syndicate by John Button in 1942. Between 1959 and 1973 the first 38 volumes of this series were systematically revised as part of a project directed by Harriet Adams, Edward Stratemeyer's daughter. The original version of this book was rewritten in 1970 by Richard Deming resulting in two different stories with the same title.

Because of Dr. John Button's death in 1967, The Clue Of The Broken Blade (1942) entered the Canadian Public Domain on January 1, 2017.

Plot

Revised edition
After their fencing instructor Ettore Russo tells them about a family sword, the championship saber Adalante, the Hardy Boys go to California to search for the sword's missing half. Supposedly written on the sword is the owner's will that names the fencing instructor as a major heir of his deceased grandfather's fortune.  Others also intent on finding the sword try hard to foil the Hardys from getting there first.

Original edition
Frank and Joe travel with their detective father, Fenton Hardy, to a town two hours from Bayport to break up a truck hijacking ring and recover two stolen swords for wealthy shipping magnate Arthur Barker.

References

The Hardy Boys books
1942 American novels
1942 children's books
Grosset & Dunlap books
Novels set in California